Phaeoramularia angolensis is a fungal plant pathogen infecting citruses.

References

External links 
 Index Fungorum
 USDA ARS Fungal Database

Fungal citrus diseases
Mycosphaerellaceae
Fungi described in 1986